José de Carabantes (Carabantes) (1628 in Aragon – 1694) was a Spanish Capuchin theologian. He worked for the evangelization of the Native Americans in Spanish America.

Works
He wrote a work entitled "Ars addicendi atque docendi idiomata", and likewise a "Lexicon, seu vocabularium verborum, adverbiorum, etc.", for the use of missionaries (Madrid, 1678).

References

Attribution
 The entry cites:
A biography of Father Carabantes was published at Madrid in 1705 by Diego Gonzales de Quiraga.

1628 births
1694 deaths
Capuchins
17th-century Spanish Roman Catholic theologians